GIH may refer to:
 Andrew Gih (1901–1985), Chinese Christian evangelist
 Githabul language
 Gymnastik- och idrottshögskolan, a Swedish college of sports and exercise science